Patricia Silva may refer to: 

 Patricia Batista da Silva, Brazilian handball player
 Patrícia Da Silva (born 1990), Swiss-Portuguese model and beauty pageant titleholder
 Patrícia Silva (athlete), Peruvian track runner at the 1999 Summer Universiade
 Patricia Silva (politician), Chilean interim cabinet member during the presidency of Michelle Bachelet
 Patricia Silva (volleyball), Brazilian beach volleyball gold medalist at the 2014 Summer Youth Olympic Games
 Patricia A. E. Pereira de Silva, Portuguese gymnast at the 2013 World Rhythmic Gymnastics Championships
 Patricia da Silva (referee), Uruguayan official during the 2006 South American Women's Football Championship
 Patricia de Sousa E Silva, Portuguese gymnast at the 2013 World Rhythmic Gymnastics Championships